Brazil competed at the 2013 World Aquatics Championships in Barcelona, Spain between July 20 and August 4, 2013.

Medalists

Diving

César Castro is the only athlete to compete.

Men

Open water swimming

Brazil qualified six athletes (4 men and 2 women) to compete.

Men

Women

Mixed

Swimming

Brazilian swimmers earned qualifying standards in the following events (up to a maximum of 2 swimmers in each event at the A-standard entry time, and 1 at the B-standard): A total of 23 swimmers (13 men and 10 women) are selected to compete at the World Championships, including world record holder and undisputed superstar César Cielo and Olympic silver medalist Thiago Pereira.

Men

Women

Synchronized swimming

Brazil nominated 10 athletes to compete.

* Reserves

Water polo

Brazil qualified a women's team.

Women's tournament

Team roster

Manuela Canetti
Diana Abla
Marina Zablith
Marina Canetti
Luciane Maia
Adhara Santoro
Melani Dias
Izabela Chiappini
Victoria Muratore
Flávia Vigna
Mirella Coutinho
Viviane Bahia
Victoria Chamorro

Group play

Round of 16

References

External links
Official website

Nations at the 2013 World Aquatics Championships
2013
World Aquatics Championships